Cyril Ikechukwu Nri  (born 25 April 1961) is a Nigerian-born British actor who is best known for playing Superintendent Adam Okaro in the police TV series The Bill.

Early life 
Nri was born in on 25 April 1961 in Nigeria. Nri's family are Igbo; they fled the country in 1968 prior to the end of the Nigerian Civil War. He moved to Portugal when he was seven, and later to London.

Nri attended Holland Park School in West London and appeared in a school production of Three Penny Opera. He attended the Young Vic Youth Theatre in Waterloo, London. He trained at the Bristol Old Vic Theatre School. Nri has lived in south London since the 1980s.

Career 
He is best known for playing the role of Superintendent Adam Okaro, later chief superintendent, in the long-running ITV police drama The Bill. He also had a role as Graham, a barrister colleague of Miles and Anna, in both series of the cult BBC TV drama series This Life.

After drama school at the Bristol Old, Vic Nri started acting life at The Royal Shakespeare Company where his first role was Lucius in Ron Daniel's 1982 production of Julius Caesar.
He played Ariel to Max Von Sydow's Prospero in Jonathan Miller's 1988 production of The Tempest.

In 2008, he starred alongside other former The Bill favourites Philip Whitchurch and Russell Boulter in an episode of BBC1's Waking the Dead.

In 2009, he appeared in The Observer at the Royal National Theatre.

In 2009 and 2010, he appeared in Law & Order UK as Judge Demarco and again reprised this role in the 2012 and 2013 series of the show.

In February 2010, he guest starred in Doctors.

In November 2010, he appeared in Series 4 of The Sarah Jane Adventures, in the "Lost in Time" episodes. He later reappeared in October 2011, in the opening episode of Series 5, "Sky".

In 2012–13, he played Cassius in Greg Doran's Royal Shakespeare Company production of Julius Caesar in Stratford upon Avon, London and New York, where in his New York Times review Ben Brantley said of Nri, "Mr. Nri's expression as he registers Caesar's words is that of a man who feels a noose tightening around his neck. Wary and sly, scared and manipulative, Mr. Nri is an excellent Cassius, capturing the climate of paranoia and politicking that thickens the air."

In 2016, he earned a British Academy Television Award nomination for his performance as Lance in the Russell T. Davies TV series Cucumber.
He also appeared in an episode of Goodnight Sweetheart playing a doctor at the hospital where Yvonne Sparrow loses her unborn child (series 4).

In 2016, he played Polonius in Simon Godwin's production of Hamlet for the Royal Shakespeare Company.

In late October 2016, he made his debut as a recurring character in the Doctor Who spin-off Class.

In 2017, he also had a minor role in an episode of the long-running BBC detective programme Death in Paradise, playing a corrupt mayor.

In 2020, he played a barrister in the BBC drama Noughts and Crosses.

In 2021, he played Sheldon in the Royal National Theatre's production of Trouble in Mind by Alice Childress.

Personal life 
Nri has been married, and now identifies as gay. He has two grown-up children.

Partial filmography 

 Strapless (1989) .... Harold Sabola
 Saracen (1989, TV Series) .... Desmond
 The Bill (1990–2006, TV Series) .... Barrister Julian Bates / Borough Commander Adam Okaro / Pascal Illunga
 Runaway Bay (1992, TV Series) .... Paul
 Frank Stubbs Promotes (1993, TV Series) .... Baxter
 Calling the Shots (1994, TV Series) .... Paul
 The Steal (1995) .... Council Computer Operator
 Pie in the Sky (1996, TV Series) .... Stuart Crowe
 This Life (1996–1997, TV Series) .... Graham
 Behind the Mask (1997, Short) .... Kano
 Goodnight Sweetheart (1997, TV Series) .... Dr. Obote
 Tale of the Mummy (1998) .... Forensics
 Only Love (1998, TV Movie) .... Eric Blair
 Besieged (1998) .... Priest
 Wing Commander (1999) .... Security Officer
 A Touch of Frost (1999, TV Series) .... Warren Barber
 Family Affairs (2000, TV Series) .... William McHugh
 Arabian Nights (2000, TV Mini-Series) .... Schaca
 Holby City (2000–2011, TV Series) .... Pastor Carl / Lawrence Marshall / Ben Sinclair
 Down to Earth (2001, TV Series) .... Henry Jones
 EastEnders (2001–2002, TV Series) .... DS Burton
 Doctors (2001–2017, TV Series) .... Inspector Tony Callaghan / Thomas Hakizimana / Mark Harmer / Andrew Lombard
 Long Time Dead (2002) .... Dr. Wilson
 Harry Hill's TV Burp (2002, TV Series) .... Supt. Adam Okaro
 Murder Investigation Team (2003, TV Series) .... Supt. Adam Okaro
 Cold Blood (2007, TV Series) .... Colonel Harrington Smith
 Deadmeat (2007) .... Prime Minister
 Survivor (2008, Short) .... Boss
 Bad Day (2008) .... Restaurant Manager
 Waking the Dead (2008, TV Series) .... Raymond Ayanike
 Law & Order: UK (2009–2010, TV Series) .... Judge Demarco
 Tinga Tinga Tales (2010, TV Series) .... Peacock
 The Sarah Jane Adventures (2010–2011, TV Series) .... The Shopkeeper
 House of Anubis (2011, TV Series) .... Philip Lewis
 Julius Caesar (2012, TV Movie) .... Cassius
 Wizards vs Aliens (2012, TV Series) .... Nathaniel Nightjar
 Cucumber (2015, TV Series) .... Lance
 Crims (2015, TV Series) .... Mr Gardener
 Royal Shakespeare Company: Hamlet (2016) .... Polonius
 Class (2016, TV Series) .... Chair
 Death in Paradise (2017, TV Series) .... Mayor Joseph Richards
 Jellyfish (2018) .... Adam Hale
 Cult-Movie (2019) .... DI Makepeace
 Star Wars: The Rise of Skywalker (2019) .... First Order officer #2

References

External links 
 

Living people
1961 births
20th-century English male actors
21st-century English male actors
Alumni of Bristol Old Vic Theatre School
Black British male actors
English male film actors
English male soap opera actors
English people of Nigerian descent
English people of Igbo descent
Igbo male actors
LGBT Black British people
English gay actors
Nigerian gay actors
Nigerian emigrants to the United Kingdom
People educated at Holland Park School
21st-century Nigerian LGBT people